Tigermouth (so named for the lead singer's unique canine teeth dentition) is the first solo studio album by singer-songwriter Kelli Ali released in 2003.

Previously, Ali was the lead vocalist for Sneaker Pimps, a trip-hop group, who are best known for their 1996 album Becoming X which featured Ali on vocals.

Ali co-produced and co-wrote the album with internationally renowned producers, Rick Nowels and Marius de Vries.

Singles released off the album include, "Kids", "Inferno High Love", and "Teardrop Hittin' the Ground".

Overview
Tigermouth was recorded primarily in Los Angeles at the home studios of hit-making producer Rick Nowels. Nowels' knack with radio-friendly hooks and the sunny climate of L.A. clearly informed Tigermouth, which is a bright, lush, and unabashedly pop-oriented record. Tigermouth stands in stark contrast to the moody, atmospheric sounds associated with Ali's Sneaker Pimps recordings.

However, because of this new sound and her high-profile collaborators, some in the British press dismissed the album as a blatant grab for "mainstream" success. Ali herself responded to this criticism a year later on her website:

Nothing could have been further from my mind... For the sake of ease and sales, it is easier for the media to "understand" what it is they're selling but rest assured, I make music with all my heart and soul without any commercial interest what so ever [sic] and I am glad that I made Tigermouth when and how and with whom I made it. The doubters may kiss my sorry ass.

Tigermouth was not a commercial success upon its release, despite its radio-friendly disposition.

Track listing
All songs written by Kelli Ali and Rick Nowels except where noted:

Personnel
Kelli Ali - Vocals, Background Vocals
Rusty Anderson - Guitar (Electric), Effects
Curt Bisquera - Percussion
Andy Bradfield - Engineer
Greg Collins - Engineer
David Dale - Mixing
John Densmore - Hand Percussion
Matt Fields - Assistant Engineer
Chris Garcia - Bass, Guitar, Engineer
Ashley Howe - Mixing
Manny Marroquin - Mixing
Kieron Menzies - Engineer
Rick Nowels - Guitar (Acoustic), Guitar (Electric), Keyboards, Mellotron, Chamberlain, Wurlitzer
John Pierce - Bass
Tim Pierce - Guitar (Electric)
Wayne Rodrigues - Keyboards, Drum Programming
Mark "Spike" Stent - Mixing
Alan Veucasovic - Engineer
Wayne Wilkins - Engineer, Digital Editing
Randy Wine - Engineer

Production
Art Direction: Think 1
Digital Manipulation: Absynthe Photographic
Photography: Sandrine Dulermo
Project Coordinator: Colleen Reynolds, Kristin Johnson

Tigermouth-era B-Sides
"Lipgloss" (Kelli Ali, Rick Nowels) - 3:24
"Lucifer Rising" (Kelli Ali, Rick Nowels) - 4:59
"Paper Moon" (Kelli Ali, Rick Nowels) - 4:05

Tigermouth Official Track Remixes
"Kids" (Mark 'Spike' Stent Radio Edit/Radio Edit) - 3:54
"Kids" (Rawkish Mix) - 7:21
"Kids" (Armand Van Helden Rockish Mix Radio Edit) - ?:??
"Kids" (Rui Da Silva Vocal Mix) - 8:15
"Kids" (Jagz Kooner Vocal Mix) - ?:??
"Kids" (Jagz Kooner Dub) - ?:??
"Inferno High Love" (Riva Radio Edit) - 3:28
"Inferno High Love" (Riva Vocal Mix) - ?:??
"Inferno High Love" (Sharpboys Atomic Dub) - ?:??
"Inferno High Love" (Sharpboys Atomic Vocal Mix) - 7:38
"Teardop Hittin' The Ground" (Nellee Hooper Mix) - 3:50

Tigermouth Promotional Version Info
The promotional version of Tigermouth was released on 24 June 2002 with "Paper Moon" as track number nine, in between "The Infinite Stars" and "Kids". "Moon" was later released in 2003 as a B-side to the "Teardrop Hittin' The Ground" single. The "Tigermouth" promotional version listed "Teardrop Hittin' The Ground" under its original title, "Teardrop", and did not contain the following tracks, which are featured on the final release: "Keep on Dreaming", "Beautiful Boy" and "Wings in Motion". It also included an alternate version of "The Infinite Stars" with quieter electric guitars.

References
 Ali, Kelli. http://kelliali.com/assets/pages/cattales/writingtiger/recordingtmouthla/index.htm. Accessed on 30 December 2005.
 Ali, Kelli. http://kelliali.com/assets/pages/cattales/writingtiger/recordingtmouthla/index.htm. Accessed on 30 December 2005.
 Tigermouth booklet
 Tigermouth promo booklet
 http://theinfinitestar.co.uk/index.html. Accessed on 30 December 2005.

2003 albums
Albums produced by Marius de Vries
Kelli Ali albums
Albums produced by Rick Nowels
Contemporary R&B albums by English artists
Dance-pop albums by English artists